Jessica Metcalfe is a Native American blogger. She is a citizen of the Turtle Mountain Chippewa Tribe in Belcourt, North Dakota.

Early life and education 
Metcalfe grew up in Dunseith, North Dakota. Growing up, Metcalfe avoided wearing clothing that would identify her as indigenous due to racial tensions at the time.

She received her undergraduate degree from Dartmouth College and a PhD from the University of Arizona in American Indian studies.

Career 
She was a managing editor and a writer for the International Journal of Indigenous Literature, Arts, & Humanities blog Red Ink Magazine. She was a professor at the Turtle Mountain Community College and the Arizona State University where she taught Native American studies, studio art, art history, literature, and anthropology.

Metcalfe has spoken as a guest speaker about her journey in the fashion industry and also Native American issues at Ohio State University, Brown University and University of North Dakota. She has also presented at numerous national conferences including the Entrepreneurship & Indigenous Art Conference, the Smithsonian and Museum of Contemporary Native Arts, and co-curated exhibitions. Her current work focuses on Native American art, clothing, and design from past to modern times, with an emphasis on contemporary artists. Metcalfe says she is passionate about feminism and feels she has to uphold the power from the long line of strong and independent women that came before her.

In 2013 Metcalfe organized the Native American Fashion Show for the Idyllwild Arts Foundation Theatre in Idyllwild, California. That same year, she curated an exhibit on Native fashion at the Museum of Indian Arts & Culture in Santa Fe, New Mexico.

In 2015 she was an advisor for the Peabody Essex Museum's Native Fashion Now exhibit.

In 2017 she appeared in the September issue of Glamour magazine.

Beyond Buckskin 
In 2009 Metcalfe created her blog, Beyond Buckskin, to share her research about Native fashion online. 

Following the success of the blog, Metcalfe opened Beyond Buckskin Boutique in 2012, where she showcases the works of native designers in hopes of challenging people's conceptions of native artists. As of 2017 she had partnered with 40 native artists and designers. In 2016, she brought her online boutique to life with a retail store called Brick and Mortar on the Turtle Mountain Indian Reservation. 

Metcalfe has become an advocate for the movement "Buy Native", which promotes cross-cultural collaborations and aims to give people who admire native fashion a place to buy directly from the original native artist.

Metcalfe has also commented on cultural appropriation on social media and in her boutique.

Personal life 
In 2012 Metcalfe moved to Gardena, North Dakota.

References

External links 
 Beyond Buckskin Blog
 Beyond Buckskin Boutique

Year of birth missing (living people)
Living people
Dartmouth College alumni
University of Arizona alumni
American online retailer founders
American fashion businesspeople
American bloggers
Ojibwe people
Native American women writers
21st-century American women
21st-century Native American women
21st-century Native Americans